Szimonetta Planéta (born 12 December 1993) is a Hungarian handballer for Debreceni VSC and the Hungarian national team.

Achievements
Nemzeti Bajnokság I:
Winner: 2010, 2011, 2012
Magyar Kupa:
Winner: 2010, 2011, 2012, 2015
EHF Champions League:
Finalist: 2012
Semifinalist: 2010, 2011

Awards and recognition
 All-Star Centre Back of the Møbelringen Cup: 2018

References

External links

Profile on Győri Audi ETO KC Official Website
Career statistics at Worldhandball

1993 births
Living people
People from Kazincbarcika
Hungarian female handball players
Győri Audi ETO KC players
Expatriate handball players
Hungarian expatriate sportspeople in Germany
Hungarian expatriate sportspeople in France
Sportspeople from Borsod-Abaúj-Zemplén County